Charles George Lyttelton, 8th Viscount Cobham (27 October 1842 – 9 June 1922), known as The Lord Lyttelton from 1876 to 1889, was a British peer and politician from the Lyttelton family. He was a Liberal Member of Parliament.

Biography
Cobham was the eldest son of George William Lyttelton, 4th Baron Lyttelton, and Mary Glynne. Alfred Lyttelton was his younger brother. He was educated at Eton and Trinity College, Cambridge.

He was elected to the House of Commons for East Worcestershire in 1868, a seat he held until 1874. Apart from his parliamentary career he also served as high sheriff of Bewdley. Cobham succeeded his father as fifth Baron Lyttelton in 1876. In 1889 he also succeeded his distant relative Richard Temple-Nugent-Brydges-Chandos-Grenville, 3rd Duke of Buckingham and Chandos, as eighth Baron and Viscount Cobham.

Cobham married the Hon. Mary Susan Caroline Cavendish, daughter of William George Cavendish, 2nd Baron Chesham, in 1878. He died in June 1922, aged 79, and was succeeded in his titles by his eldest son John. His second son George William Lyttelton became a classics master at Eton and was the father of the jazz trumpeter Humphrey Lyttelton. Lady Cobham died in 1937.

He came from a cricketing family, his father (GW Lyttelton), five brothers (GWS Lyttelton, AT Lyttelton, RH Lyttelton, E Lyttelton, Hon. A Lyttelton), his sons (JC Lyttelton, CF Lyttelton) and his grandson (CJ Lyttelton) all playing first-class cricket, and in the case of the Hon. A Lyttelton Test cricket. He himself played 35 first-class matches between 1861 and 1867, mainly for Cambridge University. A right-handed batsman and wicketkeeper, he scored 1439 runs at an average of 27.15, including 2 centuries. Cobham was President of Marylebone Cricket Club in 1886.

Cobham was a member of the Tennis Committee of the Marylebone Cricket Club which was responsible for framing standardized rules for the new sport of lawn tennis. These unified Laws of Lawn Tennis were published on 29 May 1875.

From 2 March 1898 Cobham held the post of 'Honorary Colonel' of the 1st Volunteer, later 7th Battalion, Worcestershire Regiment.

Notes

References

External links 
 

1842 births
1922 deaths
Lyttelton, Charles
Lyttelton, Charles
UK MPs who inherited peerages
Lyttelton, Charles
Lyttelton, Charles
Lyttelton, Charles
Lyttelton, Charles
Free Foresters cricketers
Lyttelton, Charles
Lyttelton family
People educated at Eton College
Alumni of Trinity College, Cambridge
Marylebone Cricket Club cricketers
Gentlemen cricketers
North v South cricketers
Southgate cricketers
Gentlemen of the North cricketers
8
R. D. Walker's XI cricketers